The Songhai people (also Ayneha, Songhay or Sonrai), Hausa : mutanen sonhay, zabarmawa, dendawa, Gaoborori, Tuareg languages : ihatan(ayneha), izabarmane, Arabic languages : zabarmawi, Mande : koroboro are ethnolinguistic group in West Africa who speak the various Songhai languages. Their history and lingua franca is linked to the Songhai Empire which dominated the western Sahel in the 15th and 16th century. Predominantly a Muslim community, the Songhai are found primarily throughout Niger and Mali in the Western sudanic region (not the country). The name Songhai was historically neither an ethnic nor linguistic designation, but a name for the ruling caste of the Songhay Empire which are the Songhai proper of sunni and Askya dynasty found predominantly in present-Niger. However, the correct term used to refer to this group of people collectively by the natives is "Ayneha". Although some Speakers in Mali have also adopted the name Songhay as an ethnic designation, other Songhay-speaking groups identify themselves by other ethnic terms such as Zarma (or Djerma, the largest subgroup) or Isawaghen. The dialect of Koyraboro Senni spoken in Gao is unintelligible to speakers of the Zarma dialect of Niger, according to at least one report. The Songhay languages are commonly taken to be Nilo-Saharan but this classification remains controversial . Nicolai considers the songhay languages as a afro-asiatic Berber subgroup or a new subgroup of semitic languages restructured under Mande and nilo Saharan influence, the lexicon of songhay languages includes many completes lexical fields close to Berbers languages, old and new semitic, northern songhay speakers are Berbers from Tuareg people : Dimmendaal (2008) believes that for now it is best considered an independent language family.

The songhay live between Sahel/Sahara along the loop of the Niger river, a region called The hump of the camel by historians, where they cultivate paddy rice along the river, wheat, tobacco, onion, vegetables and spices in the valleys and on the plateaus, they also raise large cattle made up of ox, camel, goat, sheep, donkey and especially horses, the songhay land being considered as the land of war horses .
Sorko songhay fisherman lived on the large islands of the river hunt hippopotamus on the river and catch big fish . The songhay inhabitants in the Saharan oases such as the Belbali people of Tabelbala, Tindouf and the ingalkoyyu people of Ingal have large palm groves of date palms, idaksahak people and igdalen people songhay speakers are nomadic camel herders .
The songhay converted to Islam since 8th century by Libyan Arab traders, are among the first people of west Africa to convert to Islam and were the first to convert Fula people, the songhay cities of Gao, Djenne, Timbuktu have enjoyed great renown and have been great centers of knowledge .

A Saharan group detached from the Nubians of the Nile River in the 7th Millenium for the central Sahara and identified with the kiffians of the gobero site in Aïr Mountains associated with a group (probably chadic) detached from the cushitic in the 4th Millenium who would be identified with the Tenerian culture in Aïr Mountains would be the original background of the populations who have absorbed the small Niger-Congo groups from the loop of the Niger River, that the Berber groups found and mixed with it, the agglutination of these groups during history with several Fula people, sanhaja, Mandé peoples, Tuareg people, Arab and also Moroccan/Spanish groups having invaded the Songhai Empire contributed to the formation of the current songhai people.

The songhay people have a long military history, a long equestrian and caravan tradition, the Songhay have founded several dynasties and political entities over vast territories such as the Za Dynasty, the Gao Empire, the Songhai Empire and the Zabarma Emirate, The Songhai Empire remains the largest state that subsaharan Africa has known, reigning over almost of west Africa (except coastal territories of the gulf of guinea) over all of the Sahel to the door of central Africa and spreading over the North Africa, was a power of its time and radiated in the 15th and 16th centuries with the other empires dominating the world such as the Inca Empire in South America, Aztec Empire in Latin America, the Ottoman Empire in Middle East, the Mughal Empire in the Indian subcontinent, the Ming dynasty of China, the Timurid Empire in central Asia and the safavid empire in Iran . In times of migration the songhai (zarma people) are led by patriarch and in times of war gather under the order of a military chief call wonkoy like those who defeated the caliphate of Sokoto and raid these northern borders, defeated Tukulor invasions and raiding Tuareg confederations.
The zabarma Emirate founded by itinerant Muslim monks and horse traders descended from their native Sahel was a late 19th century military entity  that led from garrison town of kasena conquered much of the voltaic plateau ( south Burkina Faso, North and North Central Ghana), carved out the Gurunsi people, the Dagomba people, the Mandé peoples the Mossi people and kingdom of Wala territories.

He have conquered many regions and Established many kingdom outside their Homeland and provided many great Muslim scholars . The songhay personalities who have had a great impact on history are the emperors Sunni Ali, Askia Muhammad I and the scholars Ahmad Baba al-Timbukti, Mahmud Kati authors of Tarikh al-Fattash and abd Al Rahman al sa'adi author of Tarikh al-Sudan .

Geographic distribution
The songhai people occupy the Sahel/Sahara region between North Africa and subsaharan Africa, from the North of Mali in the west to the Sudan in the East and from the south-west of Algeria to the North of Nigeria and Benin passing through Niger republic where the majority is concentrated, the far north of Burkina Faso and Ghana where a few communities have migrated.

History

za dynasty 

The Za dynasty or Zuwa dynasty were rulers of a medieval kingdom based in the towns of Kukiya and Gao on the Niger River in what is today modern Mali. The Songhai people at large all descended from this kingdom. The most notable of them being the Zarma people of Niger who derive their name "Zarma (Za Hama)" from this dynasty, which means "the descendants of Za".

Al-Sadi's seventeenth century chronicle, the Tarikh al-Sudan, provides an early history of the Songhay as handed down by oral tradition. The chronicle reports that the legendary founder of the dynasty, Za Alayaman (also called Dialliaman), originally came from the Yemen and settled in the town of Kukiya. The town is believed to have been near the modern village of Bentiya on the eastern bank of the Niger River, north of the Fafa rapids, 134 km south east of Gao. Tombstones with Arabic inscriptions dating from the 14th and 15th centuries have been found in the area. Kukiya is also mentioned in the other important chronicle, the Tarikh al-fattash. The Tarikh al-Sudan relates that the 15th ruler, Za Kusoy, converted to Islam in the year 1009–1010 A.D. At some stage the kingdom or at least its political focus moved north to Gao. The kingdom of Gao capitalized on the growing trans-Saharan trade and grew into a small regional power before being conquered by the Mali Empire in the early 13th century.

Gao Empire and Gao saney

Gao-Saney became well known among African historians because French administrators discovered here in a cave covered with sand in 1939 several finely carved marble stelae produced in Almeria in Southern Spain. Their inscriptions bear witness of three kings of a Muslim dynasty bearing as loan names the names of Muhammad and his two successors. From the dates of their deaths it appears that these kings of Gao ruled at the end of the eleventh and the beginning of the twelfth centuries CE. 
According to recent research, the Zaghe kings commemorated by the stelae are identical with the kings of the Za dynasty whose names were recorded by the chroniclers of Timbuktu in the Ta'rikh al-Sudan and in the Ta'rikh al-Fattash. Their Islamic loan name is in one case complemented by their African name. It is on the basis of their common ancestral name Zaghe corresponding to Za and the third royal name Yama b. Kama provided in addition to 'Umar b. al-Khattab that the identity between the Zaghe and the Za could be established.

It appears from this table that Yama b. Kima (or 'Umar b. al-Khattab), the third king of the stelae of Gao-Saney, is identical with the 18th ruler of the list of Za kings. His name is given in the Ta'rikh al-Fattash (1665) as Yama-Kitsi and in the Ta'rikh al-Sudan (1655) as  Biyu-Ki-Kima. On account of this identification the dynastic history of the Gao Empire can now to be established on a solid documentary basis. 
Apart from some Arabic epitaphs on tombstones discovered in 1939 at the cemetery of Gao-Saney (6 km to the east of the city) there are no surviving indigenous written records that date from before the middle of the 17th century. 
Our knowledge of the early history of the town relies on the writings of external Arabic geographers living in Morocco, Egypt and Andalusia, who never visited the region. These authors referred to the town as Kawkaw or Kuku. The two key 17th century chronicles, the Tarikh al-Sudan and the Tarikh al-Fattash, provide information on the town at the time of the Songhai Empire but they contain only vague indications on the time before. The chronicles do not, in general, acknowledge their sources. Their accounts for the earlier periods are almost certainly based on oral tradition and for events before the second half of the 15th century they are likely to be less reliable. For these earlier periods the two chronicles sometimes provide conflicting information.
The earliest mention of Gao is by al-Khwārizmī who wrote in the first half of the 9th century. In the 9th century Gao was already an important regional power. Al-Yaqubi wrote in his Tarikh in around 872: 
There is the kingdom of the Kawkaw, which is the greatest of the realms of the Sūdān, the most important and most powerful. All the kingdoms obey its king. Al-Kawkaw is the name of the town. Besides this there are a number of kingdoms of which the rulers pay allegiance to him and acknowledge his sovereignty, although they are kings in their own lands.
In the 10th century Gao was already Muslim and was described as consisting of two separate towns. Al-Muhallabi, who died in 990, wrote in a lost work quoted in the biographical dictionary compiled by Yaqut:  
Their king pretends before his subject to be a Muslim and most of them pretend to be Muslims too. He has a town on the Nile [Niger], on the eastern bank, which is called Sarnāh, where there are markets and trading houses and to which there is continuous traffic from all parts. He has another town to the west of the Nile [Niger] where he and his men and those who have his confidence live. There is a mosque there where he prays but the communal prayer ground is between the two towns.
The archaeological evidence suggests that there were two settlements on the eastern bank of the Niger: Gao Ancien situated within the modern town, to the east of the Tomb of Askia, and the archaeological site of Gao-Saney (Sané in French) situated around 4 km to the east. The bed of the Wadi Gangaber passes to the south of the Gao-Saney occupation mound (tell) but to the north of Gao Ancien. The imported pottery and glass recovered from Gao-Saney suggest that the site was occupied between the 8th and 12th centuries. It is possible that Gao-Saney corresponds to Sarnāh of al-Muhallabi. Al-Bakri writing in 1068 also records the existence of two towns, but al-Idrisi writing in around 1154 does not. Both al-Muhallabi (see quote above) and al-Bakri situate Gao on the west (or right bank) of the Niger. The 17th century Tarikh al-Fattash also states that in the 10th century Gao was situated on the Gourma side (i.e. the west bank) of the river. A large sand dune, La Dune Rose, lies on the west bank opposite Gao, but at Koima, on the edge of the dune at a site 4 km north of Gao, surface deposits indicate a pre 9th century settlement. This could be the west bank Gao mentioned by 10th and 11th century authors. The site has not been excavated.

Al-Sadi in his Tarikh al-Sudan gives a slightly later date for the introduction of Islam. He lists 32 rulers of the Zuwa dynasty and states that in 1009–1010 A.D. the 15th ruler, Zuwa Kusoy, was the first to convert to Islam.

Towards the end of the 13th century Gao lost its independence and became part of the expanding Mali Empire. What happened to the Zuwa rulers is not recorded. Ibn Battuta visited Gao in 1353 when the town formed part of the Mali Empire. He arrived by boat from Timbuktu on his return journey from visiting the capital of the Empire:Then I travelled to the town of Kawkaw, which is a great town on the Nīl [Niger], one of the finest, biggest, and most fertile cities of the Sūdān. There is much rice there, and milk, and chickens, and fish, and the cucumber, which has no like. Its people conduct their buying and selling with cowries, like the people of Mālī.

After staying a month in the town, Ibn Battuta left with a caravan for Takedda and from there headed north back across the Sahara to an oasis in Tuat with a large caravan that included 600 slave girls.

Sometime in the 14th century, Ali Kulun, the first ruler of the Sunni dynasty, rebelled against Mali hegemony, and was defeated.; It was not until the first half of the 15th century that Sunni Sulayman Dama was able to throw off the Mali yoke. His successor, Sunni Ali Ber (1464–1492), greatly expanded the territory under Songhay control and established the Songhay Empire.

Rule of the Mali Empire

Towards the end of the 13th century Gao lost its independence and became part of the expanding Mali Empire.

According to the Tarikh al-Sudan, the cities of Gao and Timbuktu submitted to Musa's rule as he traveled through on his return to Mali. According to one account given by Ibn Khaldun, Musa's general Saghmanja conquered Gao. The other account claims that Gao had been conquered during the reign of Mansa Sakura. Both of these accounts may be true, as Mali's control of Gao may have been weak, requiring powerful mansas to reassert their authority periodically.
Both chronicles provide details on Ali Kulun (or Ali Golom) the founder of the Sunni dynasty. He revolted against the hegemony of the Mali Empire. A date is not given in the chronicles but the comment in the Tarikh al-fattash that the fifth ruler was in power at time when Mansa Musa made his pilgrimage suggests that Ali Kulun reigned around the end of the 14th century.

Both chronicles associate Ali Kulun (or Ali Golom) with the Mali court. The Tarikh al-Sudan relates that his father was Za Yasoboy, and as a son of a subordinate ruler of the Mali Empire, he had to serve the sultan of Mali.

The chronicles do not specify where the early rulers lived. As there is evidence that Gao remained under Mali control until the early fifteenth century, it is probably that the early Sunni rulers controlled a region to the south, with the town of Kukiya possibly serving as their capital. As the economic strength of Mali Empire relied on controlling routes across the Sahara, it would not have been necessary to control the area to the south of Gao.

Al-Sadi, the author of the Tarikh al-Sudan uses the word Sunni or Sonni for the name of the dynasty while the Tarikh al-fattash uses the forms chi and si'i. The word may have a Malinke origin meaning "a subordinate or confidant of the ruler".

Under the rule of Sunni Sulayman, the Songhai captured the Mema region to the west of Lake Débo.

Songhai Empire

In 1464 the Songhai seceded from the declining Mali Empire, the Songhai country regained its total independence.

Formerly one of the peoples subjected by the Mali Empire, the Songhai asserted their control of the area around Gao after the weakening of the Mali Empire, founding the Songhai Empire which came to encompass much of the former Malian territories, including Timbuktu, famous for its Islamic universities, and the pivotal trading city of Djenné, and extending their rule over a territory that surpassed the former Mali and Ghana empires. Among Songhai's most noted scholars was Ahmed Baba— a highly distinguished historian frequently quoted in the Tarikh al-Sudan and other works. The people consisted of mostly fishermen and traders. Following Sonni Ali's death, Muslim factions rebelled against his successor and installed the general Askia Muhammad (formerly Muhammad Toure) who was to be the first and most important ruler of the Askia dynasty (1492–1592). Under the Askias, the Songhai empire reached its zenith.

Sub-groups

Niger 
Zarma people
Songhai proper
Wogo people
Kurtey people
Igdalen people
Ingalkoyyu people
Arma people

Algeria 
Belbali people

Mali 
Arma people
Idaksahak people

Benin 
Dendi people

Sudan 
Zarma people(zabarmawi)

Ethnicity
The Songhai people are made up of several ethnic groups, themselves made up of several subgroups and clans . If some ethnic groups are recognized as being of authentic Songhai descent, others have become so by assimilation throughout history through various means, the za dynasty or zaghe remains the backbone to which it all has become to aggregate .If the tarikh and the oral tradition evoke a southern Arabian origin of the dynasty (probably from the kingdom of axum which dominated southern Arabia at the time when the zaghe settled in the sahel and whose names of the sovereigns resemble those of the za ) and that European researchers see rather a Berber origin, the origin of the Za dynasty remains unclear as the classification of the Songhai language and the resolution of one of the dilemmas will bring that of the other.
In the 11th century a tension leads to a division of the dynasty into two branches, an eastern branch having continued to lead the Empire of Gao and at the origin of the Sunni dynasty and Askiya dynasty and a dissident western branch which migrated to the region of Timbuktu.
The development of the Gao Empire and the rise of the songhai commercial towns of the loop of the Niger allowed the installation in Songhai country of traders of various origins (Mandé, sanhadja, soninké, Tuareg, Peulh, Arabs...) who at the time was married and assimilated to the indigenous Songhai population . In the 8th century traders of Arab origin brought Islam to Songhai and cities like Timbuktu and Gao became poles of knowledge attracting even more people, the peak of the confluence of people on the bend of the Niger begins with the Mali Empire and continues with the native Songhai Empire which promotes the installation of Arab families from the Near East and Sephardic Jews of Sahara Expert in agriculture converted to Islam by the Askiya emperors, all these newcomers at the time of the power of Songhai, adopt the language of the leaders and are assimilated by the Songhai, an urban elite called koyrabore (people of the city) is formed in the big cities with the Koyra Chiini (Timbuktu) and Koyraboro Senni (Gao) dialects of Songhai as a language, it is to this category of Songhai that belongs Ahmad Baba al-Timbukti, Mahmud Kati and others . slaves brought from conquered countries are also assimilated to the culture of the country by their Songhai masters .
 The conquest of Djenne by Sonni Ali Ber was the starting point for the assimilation to Songhai of the populations of the region, the installation of garrison, the marriage between Sonni ali ber and the queen of Djenné, the importance of Djenné in As a market and center of knowledge, many Songhai migrated to the area, the newcomers made their language the main language of the city and all the Eastern Mandé peoples and Eastern Macina Fula assimilated into Songhai koyraboro and created a new variety of Songhai, the Djenné Chiini derived from Koyra Chiini.
The western zaghe separated from the eastern zaghe began during the Songhai Empire a migration from their location in the dirma near Timbuktu to the East under the leadership of the patriarch divided into 7 clans following conflict with other groups, they begin a pastoral migration which will bring them to the west of the current Republic of Niger, they are at the origin of the Zarma people and the idaksahak according to oral tradition, the Sambo patriarch is described as the ishak  brother, the ancestors of the idaksahak, on their arrival they settled on the plateau which they baptized zarmaganda (the heart of the zarma) and found on the spot Songhai and non-Songhai clans which they assimilated, with the fall of the Songhai Empire, princes of songhai took refuge in the south and linked up with the zarmas, at the time of the clan zarmas separated from those of zarmaganda to occupy the various other parts of western Niger, the waazi occupied the plateau of zidji and founded the kingdom of Dosso, the sega where tobili occupies the valley of the boboye where they hunt the mossi of the East, the fahmey occupies the plateau of the fakara, the kogori and the namari occupy the valley of the river and call all the region zarmatarey( the country of the zarmas), he thus founded two groups of distinct principalities, the principalities of zarmaganda and the principalities of zarmatarey, the zarma groups of zarmaganda are called kalley and those of zarmatarey golley, each principality is led by a zarmakoy whose power is symbolized by a drum of wars called toubal.
After the seizure of power by Askya Mohamed, the deposed emperor sonni barou and his suite settled in the Dendi where they founded ayorou, joined by the Askya with the Moroccan invasion, they founded together several principalities (Téra, Namaro, kokorou, Dargol, Sikié, Gothèye, gorouol, Karma.. )in the right bank (gourma) on the plateau of liptako-Gourma in front of zarmaganda and zarmatarey that he will baptize sonhoy (The Songhai) in memory of their fallen empire and call themselves sonhoyboro (Songhai proper) he speaks Songhoyboro Ciine dialects of zarma arrived in the gourma they found it occupied by the gourmantché whom they hunted for some, and assimilated by slavery or by neighborhood for others, it constitutes a subgroup of the zarma, because they also descend from za where zaghe, they are the political and military allies of their cousins of zarmatarey and zarmaganda during all the wars against the Sokoto Empire, the Tuareg confederations and during the zarma invasions on the voltaic plateau.
Fulani clans from macina under the leadership of their leader Malick settled near the proper songhai of the river and assimilated linguistically and ethnically to them to form a new songhai sub-group called Kurtey people, the name kurtey derives from songhai kuru (herd ) and teh (it is realizing), when the men returned from the war the women cried kurutey: the herd its realizing. the kourtey were born from the Fulani and Songhai interbreeding, the kourtey generally live on the islands of the river and were once known for their raids on the neighboring populations, they arrived on the canoes to take away man, cattle, gold.

Society

The language, society and culture of the Songhai people is barely distinguishable from the Zarma people. Some scholars consider the Zarma people to be a part of and the largest ethnic sub-group of the Songhai. Some study the group together as Zarma-Songhai people. However, both groups see themselves as two different peoples.

Social stratification
The Songhai people have traditionally been a socially stratified society, like many West African ethnic groups with castes. According to the medieval and colonial-era descriptions, their vocation is hereditary, and each stratified group has been endogamous. The social stratification has been unusual in two ways; it embedded slavery, wherein the lowest strata of the population inherited slavery, and the Zima, or priests and Islamic clerics, had to be initiated but did not automatically inherit that profession, making the cleric strata a pseudo-caste.

Louis Dumont, the 20th-century author famous for his classic Homo Hierarchicus, recognized the social stratification among Zarma-Songhai people as well as other ethnic groups in West Africa, but suggested that sociologists should invent a new term for West African social stratification system. Other scholars consider this a bias and isolationist because the West African system shares all elements in Dumont's system, including economic, endogamous, ritual, religious, deemed polluting, segregative and spread over a large region. According to Anne Haour – a professor of African Studies, some scholars consider the historic caste-like social stratification in Zarma-Songhay people to be a pre-Islam feature while some consider it derived from the Arab influence.

The different strata of the Songhai-Zarma people have included the kings and warriors, the scribes, the artisans, the weavers, the hunters, the fishermen, the leather workers and hairdressers (Wanzam), and the domestic slaves (Horso, Bannye). Each caste reveres its own guardian spirit. Some scholars such as John Shoup list these strata in three categories: free (chiefs, farmers, and herders), servile (artists, musicians and griots), and the slave class. The servile group was socially required to be endogamous, while the slaves could be emancipated over four generations. The highest social level, states Shoup, claim to have descended from King Sonni 'Ali Ber and their modern era hereditary occupation has been Sohance (sorcerer). Considered as being the true Songhai, the Sohance, also known as Si Hamey are found primarily in The Songhai in the Tillabery Region of Niger, whereas, at the top Social level in Gao, the old seat of the Songhai Empire and much of Mali, one finds the Arma who are the descendants of the Moroccan invaders married to Songhai women. The traditionally free strata of the Songhai people have owned property and herds, and these have dominated the political system and governments during and after the French colonial rule. Within the stratified social system, the Islamic system of polygynous marriages is a norm, with preferred partners being cross cousins. This endogamy within Songhai-Zarma people is similar to other ethnic groups in West Africa.

Livelihood
The Songhai people cultivate cereals and raise small herds of cattle and fish in the Niger Bend area where they live. They have traditionally been one of the key West African ethnic groups associated with caravan trade.

Culture

The Songhai being Sahelosaharians they share a broad culture in common with their immediate Sahelian neighbors who are the Tuareg with whom they have the most cultural affinity, then the Arabs of the Sahel and the Maghreb followed by the Hausa, the Fula people and others Sahelian group both Afro-Asiatic and Nilo-Saharan, to the east in  Sudan they have adopted several cultural characteristics from the Sudanese Arabs, Nubians and Beja people.

Economy

The proto-Songhay (Nilo-Saharan or Afro-asiatic pastoralists of Neolithic) who migrated in the 4th millennium BC from North East Africa (Nile Valley) to the central Sahara (Aïr Mountains) were essentially nomadic pastoralists.  Their settled descendants are partly farmers, breeders, traders, caravanners, fishermen, hunters, sedentary craftsmen occupying large historic cities and large villages and for another part nomadic herders camel breeders in the immensities of the Sahara and living in nomadic tents.

Agricultural activities
Agriculture is the primary activity of the Songhai populations.  As they live in arid and semi-arid areas the agriculture is seasonal. The rainy season in the Sahel extends over three months, compared to eight to nine dry months. Irrigation is widely practiced near the river and in the oases. The Songhai mainly cultivate cereals; their most produced crop is millet, followed by rice grown on the banks of the Niger River, then wheat and sorghum.  As elsewhere in the central Sahel, corn is grown less. Cereals that grow wild are also picked in season, such as panicum leatum or wild fonio. Other crops widely cultivated by the Songhai are Tobacco, onions, spices, tubers and moringa. Date palms are cultivated by irrigation in the oases of the Sahara, e.g. Tindouf, Tabalbala and Ingal. Mango is the most widely produced fruit, followed by oranges, watermelons, melons and gourds.

The Songhai practice agriculture with plows pulled by oxen. Unlike the Hausa people, who mainly use the daba to cultivate, the Songhai more commonly use the hilar, the hoe, and the pitchfork.

In precolonial times, before the abolition of slavery by the French in the Sahel, the Songhai employed hundreds or even thousands of servile labor razzier. Following modernization agricultural equipment such as tractors and combine harvesters is widely used.
Agricultural workers known as boogou are organized to help farmers with less labor.
After the harvest the Songhai leave their fields to the Fulani and Tuareg herders so that their cattle clean the fields; Songhai who have large herds let their own cattle clean the fields.

Animal husbandry

The Songhai practice animal husbandry according to their way of life.
The people settled in and around villages raise mainly cattle, goats (especially the Sahelian breed), sheep, poultry (especially guinea fowl), and donkeys Camels are raised for travel and also consumption, especially in the zarmaganda, in Gao and Timbuktu.

Nomadic idaksahak and igdalen pastoralists breed large livestock. The families of breeders travel the valleys of the azawakh, the azgueret, the irhazer, the tilemsi, the banks gourma of the river and the foothills of the mountains of Aïr and Adrar of the iforas. Their herds are primarily constituted of camels, but they also herd goats, sheep and oxen.  They live in tents and eat mainly dairy products.

The horse is a central element of Songhai society. The Songhai country is widely known as the land of horses, and the Songhai have developed their own breeds of horses: the djerma is a cross between the Dongola and the barb, raised along the Niger River; and the Bagzan from the Aïr Mountain, which is prized for war.  The Niger rivals the Ethiopian plateau in terms of horse ownership. The Songhai introduce their children to horses from adolescence.  Nobles possess large quantities of horses, which are used for parades, surveillance of cattle and fields. The Songhai languages have names for any type and coat of horse. In Songhai country the value of a man was measured in terms of the nobility of his horse.  Historically the Songhai delegated guarding and the maintenance of their horses to their most trustworthy captives. villages used to hold horse racing competitions especially on market days.

Notable Songhai people 
Za el-Ayamen or zaber ( za the great) or zabarkhane ancestors of Songhai, founder of the Za dynasty and the Gao Empire, originally from southern Arabia according to the tarikh, probably from the kingdom of Axum and belonging to the ethiosemitic ethnic groups .
Za kosto Moslem Dem: first king of the Gao Empire to formalize Islam as the state religion un the year 1009.
 Sonni Ali Ber: 1st Emperor of Songhai empire 
 Sonni Baru: emperor of Songhai empire
 Askia Muhammad: founder of Askia dynasty, Emperor of Songhai empire
 Askiya Musa: emperor of Songhai empire
 Askia Mohammad Benkan: emperor of Songhai empire
 Askiya Isma'il: emperor of Songhai empire
 Askiya ishaq I: emperor of Songhai empire
 Askiya Dawud: emperor of Songhai empire
 Askiya Mohammad El haj: emperor of Songhai empire
 Askiya Muhammad Bani: emperor of Songhai empire
 Askiya Ishaq II: emperor of Songhai empire
 Zarmakoy Sambo : zarma migration patriarch and ancestors of zarma people a Songhai people subgroup.
 Ishak bolombooti: ancestors of nomadic idaksahak Songhai speakers, and brother of zarmakoy Sambo according oral traditions.
Za arsiyaye : zarma patriarch
Za khaman duksa: zarma patriarch
Za armaley : zarma patriarch
 Zarmakoy taguru : great zarma monarch and patriarch
 Yefarma ishak : military leader having defeated the Moroccan army and stopping its southern advance
 Issa korombeyzey Moodi: or wangunya Issa (Issa the mother of war) military leader, marshal (wangugna) of the boboye having defeated the sokoto caliphate and stopping its northern advance.
 Hama bugaran or hamam bakara : military leader of the zidji plateau having defeated the caliphate of sokoto
 Dawda bugaran : military leader of zidji plateau having defeated the caliphate of sokoto and gwandu, and zarmakoy of Dosso kingdom
 Gabeylingah Hama kassa: military leader of liptako gourma plateau.
Alfa hano : itinerant Muslim monk, military chief, 1st emir and founder of the zabarma Emirate.
 Gazari : horse Herder and traders, military chief, 2nd Emir of zabarma Emirate
 Babatu: Horse Herder and traders, slave raiders, military leader, 3rd Emir of zabarma Emirate, founder of the garrison town of kasena, defeated by German colonial armies in Togo, by the British in Ghana and by the French in Burkina Faso, his empire collapsed.
 Zarmakoy Attiku : king of Dosso, defeated the Tukulor armies and killed Ali Buri Ndayaye last king of kingdom of jolof .
 Alfa chayib : itinerant blind Muslim monk, resisting against colonization in Niger, he declares jihad to the French and the British, he galvanizes the sultan of sultanate of Damagaram and the sultan of sokoto caliphate to revolt.

See also
Zarma people
Zin Kibaru
Songhai proper

References

Primary sources

 , translated in 
, translated in

Bibliography

.
 .
.

. Also available from Aluka but requires subscription.

.
. Link is to a scan on the Persée database that omits some photographs of the epigraphs.
.
.